The 2008–09 Nemzeti Bajnokság I, also known as NB I, was the 107th season of top-tier football in Hungary. The league was officially named Soproni Liga for sponsoring reasons. The season started on 25 July 2008 with Kaposvári Rákóczi FC beating the defending champions MTK Budapest by 3–1. The last games were played on 30 May 2009.

Promotion and relegation
FC Sopron withdrew their participation in the winter break of last year's season after they declared bankruptcy. The team was put into last place and got all points deducted. The remaining relegation spot was earned by FC Tatabánya, who finished the season with a mere 10 points.

Promotion to the league was granted to the champions of the two NB II divisions. Kecskeméti TE won the Eastern Division while the winners of the Western Division were Szombathelyi Haladás.

Overview

League table

Results

Top goalscorers
Source: adatbank.mlsz.hu  – Note: Click on "Góllövő lista" to retrieve the scorers

References

External links
 Official site 

Nemzeti Bajnokság I seasons
1
Hungary